Sassetti is a surname. Notable people with the surname include:

Andrea Sassetti (born 1960), Italian shoe designer, owner of the Italian fashion company Andrea Moda
Bernardo Sassetti (born 1970), Portuguese jazz pianist and film composer
Filippo Sassetti, (1540–1588) Italian merchant
Francesco Sassetti (1421–1490), Italian banker
João Sassetti (1892–1946), Portuguese fencer

See also
Sassetti Chapel, a chapel in the basilica of Santa Trinita, Florence, Italy